The  was a set of three luxury railway coaches operated by East Japan Railway Company (JR East) on overnight sleeping car services in Japan between 1989 and 2008.

Operations 

Coach details
The Yume Kūkan set was formed of the following three coaches.
 OShi 25 901 dining car
 OHaFu 25 901 lounge car
 ORoNe 25 901 sleeping car

OShi 25 901 dining car

The OShi 25 901 dining car was built by Tokyu Car Corporation (present-day J-TREC), with the interior designed by Tokyu Department Store.

This coach provided seating for 18 diners in the observation saloon area, and for four diners in the central compartment area.

OHaFu 25 901 lounge car

The OHaFu 25 901 lounge car was built by Fuji Heavy Industries, with the interior designed by Matsuya.

It features a bar counter, piano, and toilet facilities.

ORoNe 25 901 sleeping car

ORoNe 25 901 was a deluxe sleeping car with three compartments accommodating a total of six passengers. One compartment was a suite room consisting of a semi-double bed, a living room and bath/toilet facilities. The two other compartments were designated as "twin rooms" with two single beds and bath/toilet facilities. The suite room also featured a TV with satellite channel and video facilities.

The coach was built by Nippon Sharyo, with the interior designed by Takashimaya.

History
The three Yume Kūkan coaches were built in 1989, and were displayed at the "Yokohama Exotic Showcase '89" event before entering service.

Withdrawal and preservation
Following a Sayonara Yume Kukan Hokutosei run between Ueno and Sapporo, the three coaches were taken out of service from March 2008, and stored at Oku Depot in Tokyo.

The OHaFu 25 901 lounge car and OShi 25 901 dining car were sold to Mitsui & Co., and in May 2009, the two coaches were moved to the Lalaport Shin-Misato shopping mall in Misato, Saitama, next to Shin-Misato Station, where they were used as cafe and rest area facilities when the mall opened in September of that year. The two coaches were not officially withdrawn from JR East books until 3 June 2009.

The ORoNe 25 901 sleeping car was moved to Koto, Tokyo in December 2011, and opened in February 2012 providing additional seating accommodation for the French restaurant "A ta Gueule".

See also
 Blue Train (Japan), the generic name for sleeping car trains in Japan
 List of named passenger trains of Japan

References

External links

 Yume Kukan at Lalaport Shin-Misato 

Named passenger trains of Japan
East Japan Railway Company
Night trains of Japan
Railway services introduced in 1989
Fuji rolling stock
Nippon Sharyo rolling stock
Tokyu Car rolling stock
Railway coaches of Japan
Railway services discontinued in 2008

ja:国鉄24系客車#夢空間